Sardar Shah Mahmud Khan (Pashto/Dari: سردار شاه محمود خان – b:1890 d: 27 December 1959) was the Prime Minister of Afghanistan from May 1946 to 7 September 1953, under King Mohammed Zahir Shah's monarchy. He was from the Pashtun tribe of Barakzai Mohammedzai. He was a brother of Nadir Khan, who ousted Habibullah Kalakani (also known as Bacha-ye Saqqow), and uncle of both Zahir Shah and Sardar Mohammed Daoud Khan, his eventual successor. His other two brothers are Sardar Mohammad Hashim Khan and Sardar Shah Wali Khan. He was married to Safora Sultan, a sister of Amanullah Khan

Under his leadership, relatively free 1949 elections were permitted, in response to a mostly middle-class youth movement wanting reforms. However, by the 1952 elections, the policy reverted to strict control. Also during his time as Prime Minister, the Pakistani state was formed following India's independence from the United Kingdom. The Afghans contended that the Pashtuns living in the border regions should be given a choice to join Afghanistan or form an independent state, which led to tense relations with Pakistan from the onset. Afghanistan went through economic troubles in the early 1950s, and having failed at an ambitious irrigation scheme in western Afghanistan, Mahmud Khan was eventually replaced by Daoud Khan.

References 

1890 births
1959 deaths
Pashtun people
Prime Ministers of Afghanistan
Politicians from Dehradun